Glaucocharis unipunctalis is a moth in the family Crambidae. It was described by Sasaki in 2007. It is found in Japan (Okinawa).

References

Diptychophorini
Moths described in 2007